International German School of Brussels (iDSB) is a German international school in Wezembeek-Oppem, Flemish Brabant, Belgium, near Brussels. Founded in 1803, it has around 560 students and 80 staff.

Notable former pupils
 Sophie Tassignon, Belgian jazz singer and composer

References

External links

 International German School of Brussels
  International German School of Brussels

German
Brussels
Buildings and structures in Flemish Brabant
Secondary schools in Belgium
Education in Brussels
Wezembeek-Oppem